The 2015 William Jones Cup was the 37th staging of William Jones Cup, a top-level international basketball tournament of FIBA Asia. The tournament was held in Taiwan from 29 August until 6 September 2015. All games were played in Xinchuang Gymnasium, New Taipei City.

Men's tournament

Team standings 

|}

Day 1

Day 2

Day 3

Day 4

Day 5

Day 6

Day 7

Day 8

Day 9

Women's tournament

Team standings 

|}

Day 1

Day 2

Day 3

Day 4

Day 5

Awards

Men's tournament

Mythical Five
 Hamed Haddadi
 Mehdi Kamrani
 Moon Tae-young
 Jayson Castro
 Lin Chih-chieh

Women's tournament

References

2015
2015–16 in Taiwanese basketball
2015–16 in American basketball
2015–16 in Asian basketball
2015 in New Zealand basketball